Maury Finney (born in Humboldt, Minnesota) is an American country music saxophonist. Between 1976 and 1980, he recorded for the Soundwaves record label. Finney charted twelve times on the Billboard country singles charts. His highest-peaking single was "Coconut Grove," which reached No. 72 in 1977.

Musical career
In the 1970s, Finney owned an appliance store in East Grand Forks, Minnesota. He also played in a band called The Charms, which had regional success, before recording his debut single "Maiden's Prayer" for the Soundwaves label.

Finney's recordings for Soundwaves largely comprised instrumental covers of other artists' songs. Among these were David Houston's "Almost Persuaded," Larry Gatlin's "I Don't Wanna Cry," Hank Thompson's "The Wild Side of Life" and Ernest Tubb's "Waltz Across Texas." The singles "Maiden's Prayer," "Coconut Grove" and "I Want to Play My Horn on the Grand Ole Opry" all featured vocals from a backing chorus, and Finney provided additional vocals on the latter.

Between 1976 and 1977, he had charted the most instrumental songs of any country music artist. In 1977, the Country Music Association nominated him Instrumentalist of the Year.

Finney continued to operate his appliance store until 2001, when he retired and closed it.

Discography

Singles

B-sides

References

American male saxophonists
Living people
Musicians from Minnesota
People from Kittson County, Minnesota
Songwriters from Minnesota
21st-century American saxophonists
21st-century American male musicians
Year of birth missing (living people)
American male songwriters